Gian Franco Corsi Zeffirelli  (12 February 1923 – 15 June 2019), was an Italian stage and film director, producer, production designer and politician. He was one of the most significant opera and theatre directors of the post-World War II era, gaining both acclaim and notoriety for his lavish stagings of classical works, as well as his film adaptations of the same. A member of the Forza Italia party, he served as the Senator for Catania between 1994 until 2001.

Films he directed included the Shakespearean adaptations The Taming of the Shrew (1967), starring Elizabeth Taylor and Richard Burton; Romeo and Juliet (1968), for which he received a nomination for the Academy Award for Best Director; and Hamlet (1990), starring Mel Gibson and Glenn Close. His Biblical television miniseries Jesus of Nazareth (1977) won both national and international acclaim and is still frequently shown at Christmas and Easter in many countries.

A Grande Ufficiale OMRI of the Italian Republic since 1977, Zeffirelli also received an honorary British knighthood in 2004 when he was created a KBE. He was awarded the Premio Colosseo in 2009 by the city of Rome.

Early life
Zeffirelli was born Gian Franco Corsi Zeffirelli in the outskirts of Florence, Tuscany, Italy. He was born after an affair between Florentine Alaide Garosi, a fashion designer, and Ottorino Corsi, a wool and silk dealer from Vinci. Since both were married, Alaide was unable to use her surname or Corsi's for her child. She came up with "Zeffiretti", which are the "little breezes" mentioned in Mozart's opera Idomeneo, of which she was quite fond. However, it was misspelt in the register and became Zeffirelli. When he was six years old, his mother died and he subsequently grew up under the auspices of the English expatriate community and was particularly involved with the so-called Scorpioni, who inspired his semi-autobiographical film Tea with Mussolini (1999).

Italian researchers found that Zeffirelli was one of a handful of living people traceably consanguineous with Leonardo da Vinci. He was a descendant of one of da Vinci's siblings.

Zeffirelli graduated from the Accademia di Belle Arti Firenze in 1941 and, following his father's advice, entered the University of Florence to study art and architecture. After World War II broke out, he fought as a partisan, before he met up with British soldiers of the 1st Battalion Scots Guards and became their interpreter. After the war, he re-entered the University of Florence to continue his studies, but when he saw Laurence Olivier's Henry V in 1945, he directed his attention toward theatre instead.

While working for a scene-painter in Florence, he was introduced to Luchino Visconti, who hired him as an assistant director for the film La Terra trema, which was released in 1948. Visconti's methods had a deep impact upon Zeffirelli's later work. He also worked with directors such as Vittorio De Sica and Roberto Rossellini. In the 1960s, he made his name designing and directing his own plays in London and New York City and soon transferred his ideas to the cinema.

Career

Film

Zeffirelli's first film as director was a version of The Taming of the Shrew (1967), originally intended for Sophia Loren and Marcello Mastroianni but featured the Hollywood stars Elizabeth Taylor and Richard Burton in their stead. Taylor and Burton helped fund production and took a percentage of the profits rather than their normal salaries.

While editing The Taming of the Shrew, Zeffirelli's native Florence was devastated by floods. A month later, he released a short documentary, entitled Florence: Days of Destruction, to raise funds for the disaster appeal.

Zeffirelli's major breakthrough came the year after, when he presented two teenagers as Romeo and Juliet (1968). It made Zeffirelli a household name – no other subsequent work by him had the immediate impact of Romeo and Juliet. The film earned $14.5 million in domestic rentals at the North American box office in 1969. It was re-released in 1973 and earned $1.7 million in rentals.

Film critic Roger Ebert, for the Chicago Sun-Times, wrote: "I believe Franco Zeffirelli's Romeo and Juliet is the most exciting film of Shakespeare ever made".

After two successful film adaptations of Shakespeare, Zeffirelli went on to religious themes, first with a film about the life of St. Francis of Assisi titled Brother Sun, Sister Moon (1972), then his extended mini-series Jesus of Nazareth (1977) with an all-star cast. The latter was a major success in the ratings.

He moved on to contemporary themes with a remake of the boxing picture The Champ (1979) and the critically panned Endless Love (1981). In the 1980s, he made a series of successful films adapting opera to the screen, with such stars as Plácido Domingo, Teresa Stratas, Juan Pons and Katia Ricciarelli. He returned to Shakespeare with Hamlet (1990), casting Mel Gibson in the lead role. His adaptation of the Charlotte Brontë novel Jane Eyre (1996) was a critical success.

Zeffirelli frequently cast unknown actors in major roles: Leonard Whiting (Romeo in Romeo and Juliet), Graham Faulkner (St. Francis in Brother Sun, Sister Moon) and Martin Hewitt (David Axelrod in Endless Love).

Opera
Zeffirelli was a major director of opera productions from the 1950s in Italy and elsewhere in Europe as well as the United States. He began his career in the theatre as assistant to Luchino Visconti. Then he tried his hand at scenography. His first work as a director was buffo operas by Gioachino Rossini. He became a friend of Maria Callas and they worked together on a La traviata in Dallas, Texas, in 1958. Of particular note is his 1964 Royal Opera House production of Tosca with Maria Callas and Tito Gobbi. In the same year, he created Callas' last Norma at the Paris Opera. Zeffirelli also collaborated with Joan Sutherland, designing and directing her performances of Gaetano Donizetti's Lucia di Lammermoor in 1959. Over the years he created several productions for the Metropolitan Opera in New York, including La bohème, Tosca, Turandot and Don Giovanni. When the new Metropolitan Opera opened at Lincoln Center, he directed its first production, Samuel Barber's Antony and Cleopatra, starring Leontyne Price.

Honours
In 1996, he was awarded an honorary degree for services to the arts by the University of Kent at a graduation ceremony held in Canterbury Cathedral. In 1999, he received the Crystal Globe award for outstanding artistic contribution to world cinema at the Karlovy Vary International Film Festival. In November 2004, he was awarded an honorary knighthood by the United Kingdom.

Awards and nominations

Criticism
Zeffirelli received criticism from religious groups for what they call the blasphemous representation of biblical figures in his films. He also roused accusations of antisemitism for describing Martin Scorsese's The Last Temptation of Christ as a product of "that Jewish cultural scum of Los Angeles which is always spoiling for a chance to attack the Christian world."

Zeffirelli was a highly conservative Catholic, and served two terms in the Italian senate as a member of Silvio Berlusconi's centre-right Forza Italia party. He was criticized by members of the gay community for upholding the Catholic Church's position on homosexuality and by others for support of the Church's position on abortion, which extended to calling for capital punishment for women who had terminated a pregnancy.

He roused controversy again when he told a newspaper in 2006 that he had not suffered any harm from sexual abuse by a priest as a child.

Personal life
In 1996, Zeffirelli came out as gay, but thereafter preferred to be discreet about his personal life. Zeffirelli said that he considered himself "homosexual" rather than gay, as he felt the term "gay" was less elegant. Zeffirelli adopted two adult sons, men with whom he had lived and who worked for him for years, managing his affairs.

Allegations of sexual assault
Director Bruce Robinson claimed to have been the target of unwanted amorous attention from Zeffirelli during the filming of Romeo and Juliet, in which Robinson played Benvolio. Robinson says that he based the lecherous character of Uncle Monty in the film Withnail and I on Zeffirelli.

In 2018, the American actor Johnathon Schaech alleged that Zeffirelli sexually assaulted him during the filming of Sparrow (Storia di una capinera, 1993). Zeffirelli's son Giuseppe "Pippo", adopted by the filmmaker as an adult, issued a statement at the time denying the allegation.

Death
Zeffirelli died at his home in Rome on 15 June 2019, at the age of 96.

Selected filmography
 La Bohème (1965; production designer only)
 Florence: Days of Destruction (1966) (documentary short)
 The Taming of the Shrew (1967)
 Romeo and Juliet (1968) – Academy Award nominee, director
 Brother Sun, Sister Moon (1972)
 Jesus of Nazareth (1977)
 Cavalleria rusticana (1978) with Tatiana Troyanos and Plácido Domingo (live Metropolitan Opera House – stage director)
 Pagliacci (1978) with Teresa Stratas, Sherrill Milnes and Plácido Domingo (live Metropolitan Opera House – stage director)
 Carmen (1978)
 The Champ (1979)
 Endless Love (1981) – Razzie Award nominee
 Pagliacci (1982) with Plácido Domingo and Teresa Stratas
 Cavalleria rusticana (1982) with Plácido Domingo and Elena Obraztsova
 La Bohème (1982) (live Metropolitan Opera – stage director)
 La Traviata (1983) – Academy Award nominee, BAFTA winner, art direction; with Teresa Stratas and Plácido Domingo
 Tosca (1985) (live Metropolitan Opera – stage director)
 Otello (1986) – BAFTA winner, foreign language film; with Plácido Domingo and Katia Ricciarelli
 Young Toscanini (1988)
 Hamlet (1990)
 Don Giovanni (live Metropolitan Opera – stage director)
 Don Carlo with Luciano Pavarotti and Daniela Dessì (live La Scala – stage director)
 Storia di una capinera (also known as Sparrow; 1993) with Sheherazade Ventura
 Jane Eyre (1996)
 Tea with Mussolini (1999)
 Callas Forever (2002)

Bibliography
 Zeffirelli, Franco; John Tooley (interviews by Anna Tims), "How we made: Franco Zeffirelli and John Tooley on Tosca (1964)", The Guardian (London), 23 July 2012 on theguardian.com. Retrieved 11 August 2014.

References

External links

 
 
 
 
 
 
 Italian Senate profile
 Interview: Maria Callas and Callas Forever
 Interview with Zeffirelli from 1999 about Tea With Mussolini
 BBC Obituary: Franco Zeffirelli

1923 births
2019 deaths
British Army personnel of World War II
Italian film directors
Italian film producers
Italian opera directors
Italian Roman Catholics
Italian television directors
Italian television producers
Italian theatre directors
Best Production Design BAFTA Award winners
Honorary Knights Commander of the Order of the British Empire
LGBT Roman Catholics
LGBT film directors
LGBT theatre directors
Gay military personnel
Christian Democracy (Italy) politicians
Forza Italia politicians
Opera designers
Politicians from Florence
David di Donatello winners
David di Donatello Career Award winners
Nastro d'Argento winners
Primetime Emmy Award winners
Gay politicians
20th-century Italian politicians
21st-century Italian politicians
LGBT legislators in Italy
Scots Guards soldiers
Film people from Florence
Italian partisans
Special Tony Award recipients